Johan Kenkhuis (born 7 May 1980 in Vriezenveen, Overijssel) is an Olympic medal winning Dutch swimmer.

From a young age, Kenkhuis had a strong interest in swimming. In 1998, he won gold medals in both the 100 meter and 200 meter freestyle events in the European Junior Championships. At the 2000 Olympic Games in Sydney, Australia, Johan was a member of the bronze medal 4×200 meter freestyle relay team. He also helped the Netherlands win a silver medal at the FINA World Championships in Fukuoka, Japan in 2001 as a member of the 4×100 meter freestyle relay team.

However, by 2002, he was growing tired of the sport and close to retirement. His coach, Fedor Hes, helped him develop a different training strategy which involved spending more time on dry land. Seemingly invigorated by the new training style, Johan quickly progressed enough to win fourth place at the 50 meter freestyle event in the World Championships in Barcelona, Spain. He finished only 0.01 seconds behind the bronze medalist.

In the 2004 Olympic Games, Johan was a member of the Dutch Olympic swim team. As the starting swimmer in the 4×100 meter freestyle relay, alongside Pieter van den Hoogenband, Mitja Zastrow, and Klaas-Erik Zwering he played a critical role in securing a silver medal in the event.

Kenkhuis is currently living in Amsterdam where he is a member of De Dolfijn SPAX swim club but trains with XLence Swimteam. He is a Business and Marketing major at the Johan Cruyff University in Amsterdam.

Kenkhuis was one of only eleven openly gay athletes to participate in the 2004 Olympic Games in Athens. In November 2006 he announced that he would quit swimming on the highest level after the 2006 European Championships Short Course in Helsinki, Finland.

See also
 Dutch records in swimming
 Gay athletes

References

External links
Zwemkroniek Online Profile 
XLence Swimteam Profile 

1980 births
Living people
Dutch LGBT sportspeople
Dutch male freestyle swimmers
Olympic bronze medalists for the Netherlands
Olympic bronze medalists in swimming
Olympic silver medalists for the Netherlands
Olympic swimmers of the Netherlands
People from Vriezenveen
Swimmers at the 2000 Summer Olympics
Swimmers at the 2004 Summer Olympics
World Aquatics Championships medalists in swimming
Gay sportsmen
LGBT swimmers
Medalists at the FINA World Swimming Championships (25 m)
European Aquatics Championships medalists in swimming
Medalists at the 2004 Summer Olympics
Medalists at the 2000 Summer Olympics
Olympic silver medalists in swimming
Sportspeople from Overijssel
21st-century Dutch people